Peter Gabriel Bergmann (24 March 1915 – 19 October 2002) was a German-American physicist best known for his work with Albert Einstein on a unified field theory encompassing all physical interactions. He also introduced primary and secondary constraints into mechanics.

Early life and education
Bergmann was born into a Jewish family of Max Bergmann, a biochemistry professor and Emmy Bergmann, a pediatrician in Berlin. His father would later be a professor of chemistry at the Rockefeller Institute for Medical Research. He began college in 1931, at the age of 16, at Technische Hochschule (now TU Dresden) under the mentorship of Harry Dember. Bergmann obtained his PhD at the age of 21 from the German University in Prague in 1936 under the direction of Philipp Frank.

Bergmann's family scattered all over the world during Nazi rule; his sister Clara stayed behind and ultimately was murdered at Auschwitz.

Career
Bergmann's association with Einstein began without his knowledge in 1933, when his mother made letter correspondence to Einstein, who was then in Belgium hiding from the Nazis. Bergmann contacted Einstein again in 1935 and arrived in the United States in 1936. He worked with Einstein, as his research assistant, at the Institute for Advanced Study from October 1936 to June 1941.

After the assistantship at Princeton, Bergmann taught at Black Mountain College and at Lehigh University (1941-1944). From 1944-1947, he was engaged in war research on underwater sound at Columbia University and the Woods Hole Oceanographic Institution.

Bergmann was a professor at Syracuse University from 1947 to 1982, where he was an advisor for 32 doctoral students including Joel Lebowitz, Pantur Silaban, John Boardman, Ezra T. Newman and Rainer K. Sachs.

In 1947, no physics department in the United States had a center for research in general relativity. At Syracuse, Bergmann established one of the first research centers devoted to studying the general theory of relativity in order to reconcile it with quantum theory. A 1949 Physical Review paper by Bergmann's program contained the key ideas of nonperturbative canonical general relativity. For the rest of his career, he oriented his research on those concepts. He was concerned in the interpretation of general covariance and initiated the search for observables whose commutation relations are necessary for the successful quantization of gravity. Bergmann and his students were the primary contributors to the literature of general relativity until the mid-1950s. Twenty years later, there were more than a dozen general relativity research centers and now it is in the mainstream of current physics research.

Apart from this research, he also promoted the discussion on the concept of temperature in relativistic statistical mechanics.

When Edward P. Tryon came out in 1973 with a paper in Nature titled "Is the Universe a Vacuum Fluctuation?”, Tryon mentions how he learned from Bergmann how our universe could have started with zero energy and not contradict the conservation of energy law because mass energy is positive and gravitational energy is negative and they cancel each other out and so our universe then could begin with zero energy.

After his retirement from Syracuse, he was given Desk space at New York University where he worked with his close friend, physicist Engelbert Schucking until 1999.

Bergmann had an Erdős number of 2  (via Ernst G. Straus to Paul Erdős).

Publications
In 1942, Bergmann published the first textbook on general relativity, Introduction to the Theory of Relativity, with a foreword by Einstein. The second edition of this book was published by Dover Publications in 1976.

His other textbooks were:
The Riddle of Gravitation (Dover Publications, OCLC, 1993)
Basic Theories of Physics (Prentice Hall, OCLC, 1951)
Albert Einstein: His Influence on Physics, Philosophy and Politics with Peter C. Aichelburg and Roman Ulrich Sexl (Vieweg, OCLC 1979).

Awards
Bergmann was posthumously awarded the inaugural Einstein Prize in 2003 with John A. Wheeler for "pioneering investigations in general relativity, including gravitational radiation, black holes, spacetime singularities, and symmetries in Einstein’s equations, and for leadership and inspiration to generations of researchers in general relativity". He learned that he had won the prize only shortly before his death.

References

American relativity theorists
Syracuse University faculty
1915 births
2002 deaths
Institute for Advanced Study visiting scholars
Mathematical physicists
Jewish emigrants from Nazi Germany to the United States
Jewish American scientists
Jewish physicists
Fellows of the American Physical Society
Albert Einstein Medal recipients